The 1995 NAPA 500 was a NASCAR racing event that took place on November 12, 1995, at Atlanta Motor Speedway in Hampton, Georgia, United States. It was the final round of the 1995 NASCAR Winston Cup Series and was won by Dale Earnhardt, who also led the most laps, while Jeff Gordon won the championship.

Background

Atlanta Motor Speedway is one of ten intermediate to hold NASCAR races; the others are Charlotte Motor Speedway, Chicagoland Speedway, Darlington Raceway, Homestead Miami Speedway, Kansas Speedway, Kentucky Speedway, Las Vegas Motor Speedway, New Hampshire Motor Speedway, and Texas Motor Speedway. The track's turns are banked at twenty-four degrees, while the front stretch, the location of the finish line, and the back stretch are banked at five.

NASCAR banned tinted windshields starting with this race, confiscating any that teams had in the pits before this one. The move to mandate clear windshields was to make it easier for drivers to see through cars ahead of them and see if a driver in front was signaling them for any reason.

Most of the cars entered were Chevrolets and Fords, with a limited number of Pontiacs competing. This was the final career race for owner Alan Dillard Jr., the owner of A.G. Dillard Motorsports. It was also the final career race for long time veteran owner D.K. Ulrich. The 1995 NAPA 500 was also the final race for Bobby Hillin in the #77, Michael Waltrip in the #30, Morgan Shepherd in the #21, Dick Trickle in the #15, Dale Jarrett in the #28, Jeff Burton in the #8, Hut Stricklin in the #26 and Todd Bodine in the #75. Junior Johnson would make his final appearance in this race as a car owner. He sold his #11 team to Brett Bodine during the off-season. Some of the more notable crew chiefs to fully participate in this race were Robin Pemberton, Andy Petree, Donnie Wingo, Cecil Gordon, Ray Evernham, Larry McReynolds, and Tim Brewer. Kenny Bernstein would retire from his career as a NASCAR team owner to spend more time with his family after this race.

Points leader Jeff Gordon was ahead of Dale Earnhardt by 147 points entering the race. To win his eighth Cup championship, Earnhardt had to win the race and lead the most laps during the race to earn the maximum 185 points while Gordon had to finish 42nd (the last-place finish) and not lead a single lap during the race (drivers that lead a lap during a race earn 5 bonus points). If all this occurred, Earnhardt would win the championship by only one point. For Gordon to win his first Cup championship, he had to finish no worse than 41st without leading a single lap during the race. If Gordon led a single lap during the race, he would secure his first championship regardless of where he finished.

Race report
Dale Earnhardt defeated Sterling Marlin by nearly four seconds after 22 lead changes during the event, with a record low of two safety car periods totaling eleven laps. Earnhardt started in 11th place and came back from behind to win this race, which set a new race record for fastest 500-mile Cup race at the circuit in 3 hours, 3 minutes, 3 seconds, with an average speed of 163.633 MPH, a record that still stands after the 2019 season at the circuit. Dale Earnhardt was able to dominate this race, as they set up a very aggressive engine package that would make him untouchable all race long, and the engine held up for the win.

Ken Schrader finished dead last in this race in a coincidental manner; his engine blew and that happened to be a situation that helped Jeff Gordon clinch his championship, as he was required to finish 41st or better to win. The #26 of Hut Stricklin would be involved in an accident on the third turn. Billy Standridge, Jack Sprague, Mike Wallace, Shane Hall, Delma Cowart, and Eric Smith would fail to qualify for this race. Out of the 42-driver grid, only six of them would not finish the race. All 42 of the qualifying drivers were born in the United States.

Jeff Gordon won the 1995 NASCAR Winston Cup Series championship after finishing in 32nd-place in this race.

Qualifying

Race results

Timeline
Section reference: 
 Start of race: Darrell Waltrip had the pole position to start the race.
 Lap 2: Ricky Rudd took over the lead from Darrell Waltrip.
 Lap 7: Bobby Hamilton took over the lead from Ricky Rudd.
 Lap 16: Ricky Rudd took over the lead from Bobby Hamilton.
 Lap 18: Dale Earnhardt took over the lead from Ricky Rudd.
 Lap 55: Darrell Waltrip took over the lead from Dale Earnhardt.
 Lap 56: Sterling Marlin took over the lead from Darrell Waltrip.
 Lap 61: Jeff Gordon took over the lead from Sterling Marlin.
 Lap 62: Bill Elliott took over the lead from Jeff Gordon.
 Lap 64: Dale Earnhardt took over the lead from Bill Elliott.
 Lap 72: Caution for debris; ended on lap 77.
 Lap 82: Dale Earnhardt took over the lead from Ricky Rudd.
 Lap 92: Ken Schrader became the last-place finisher due to a faulty engine. Jeff Gordon officially clinches the championship.
 Lap 104: Robert Pressley had problems with his engine, forcing him to end the race early.
 Lap 138: Dale Earnhardt took over the lead from Bobby Labonte.
 Lap 141: Todd Bodine's engine started acting up, ending his NASCAR race weekend prematurely.
 Lap 194: Steve Grissom's transmission stopped working properly, causing him to be the fourth DNF.
 Lap 201: Dale Earnhardt took over the lead from Bobby Labonte.
 Lap 202: Hut Stricklin had a terminal crash.
 Lap 204: Caution due to Hut Stricklin's accident, ended on lap 208.
 Lap 270: Dale Earnhardt took over the lead from Bill Elliott.
 Lap 289: Dave Marcis' engine gave out, making him the 37th-place finisher in the race.
 Finish: Dale Earnhardt was officially declared the winner of the event.

Standings after the race

References

NAPA 500
NAPA 500
NASCAR races at Atlanta Motor Speedway